Maungawhau School is a primary school in the suburb of Mt Eden, Auckland, New Zealand. It caters for boys and girls from Year 1 to Year 6.

School history 
The site for the school was purchased from Joughin Farm and Manderville Estate in 1911.  The first building was erected in 1912, while the first students were taught in 1913. Over the years, the school has purchased surrounding land for new buildings. Existing buildings have been replaced or renovated.

School fair 
The school holds a fair annually. Some of the stalls have included lolly leis, Chocolate Demise, jams and preserves, books and clothes.

Notable students
Rowena Jackson (born 1926), prima ballerina

References

External links
 Official website

Educational institutions established in 1912
Primary schools in Auckland
1912 establishments in New Zealand